The 3rd Antalya Golden Orange Film Festival was held from May 24 to June 4, 1966, in Antalya, Turkey. Golden Oranges were awarded in thirteen categories to the Turkish films made in the preceding year which were selected to compete in the festival's National Feature Film Competition.

National Feature Film Competition

Golden Orange Awards 
The National Feature Film Competition Jury, headed by Nejat Duru, awarded Golden Oranges in twelve categories.
1st Best Film: Corrupt Order directed by Haldun Dormen
2nd Best Film: Blood of the Earth directed by Atıf Yılmaz
3rd Best Film: Murad's Song directed by Atıf Yılmaz
Best Director: Memduh Ün For My Honor
Best Screenplay: Erol Keskin & Haldun Dormen for Corrupt Order
Best Cinematography: Mustafa Yılmaz for  For My Honor
Best Original Music: Nedim Otyam for The Rebels
Best Actress: Selma Güneri for Last Birds & I Live as Long as I Die
Best Actor: Ekrem Bora for Bitch
Best Supporting Actress: Yıldız Kenter for The Rebels
Best Supporting Actor: Müşfik Kenter for Corrupt Order
Best Studio:Acar Film Studio for  For My Honor

National Short Film Competition

Golden Orange Awards 
Best Short Film: Love of the Stones directed by Behlül Dal

See also 
 1966 in film

References

External links
  for the festival

Antalya Golden Orange Film Festival
Antalya Golden Orange Film Festival
Antalya Golden Orange Film Festival